Developmental Biology is a peer-reviewed scientific journal. It was established in 1959 and is the official journal of the Society for Developmental Biology. It publishes research on the mechanisms of development, differentiation, and growth in animals and plants at the molecular, cellular, and genetic levels. The journal is published twice a month by Elsevier.

Abstracting and indexing 
The journal is abstracted an indexed in:

According to the Journal Citation Reports, the journal has a 2020 impact factor of 3.582.  Looking at Scimago Journal & Country Rank data trends, citations per document declined substantially between 1999 and 2020, while the number of uncited documents increased over the same period.  The number of citable documents per year published has decreased from a high of around 1,650 in 2008 to 661 in 2021.

References

External links 
 

Developmental biology journals
English-language journals
Elsevier academic journals
Delayed open access journals
Publications established in 1959
Biweekly journals